Espidezh castle is a historical castle located in Iranshahr County in Sistan and Baluchestan Province, The longevity of this fortress dates back to the Early centuries of historical periods after Islam.

References 

Castles in Iran